The Islamic Center of New England (ICNE) (Arabic: المركز الاسلامي بنيو انجلند) is an Islamic organization incorporated in the state of Massachusetts in the early 1960s.

History 
The Islamic Center of New England

A History of Building the First Mosque and Muslim Community in New England
(1931-1991)

The Islamic Center of New England in Quincy was the long-range dream of eight Lebanese families, who came to this country at the turn of the 20th century, more than 100 years ago.  They settled in the Quincy Point neighborhood, located near the Fore River Shipyard. 

The next generation, born in America to this handful of Muslim families, grew up in this same neighborhood, where they met and many were married.  In 1964, the two generations working together finally succeeded in building a mosque. It was their hope that their children would learn about their religion. But after 30 years, most of their children had grown up and married outside the faith.

An unexpected turn of events rapidly changed the demographics of the nascent community. The floodgates opened in 1965, when the United States Immigration Act was passed in Congress, and the mosque attracted Muslims from all over the world.  The new Muslims in this second big wave of immigration were educated, skilled, and talented.  They wanted their families to grow up in a Muslim community, and were relieved, as much as surprised to find a mosque in America.  They travelled from all the six New England states to join and support the Center, the only mosque in New England for more than a decade.  At this point, the founding families realized that they had built a mosque, not just for their children, but for all Muslims.

Diversity is one of the great features and challenges for the American Muslim community. The community in Quincy rapidly included people from more than 30 countries, outnumbering the handful of Lebanese founders.  Representing different cultures, races, ethnicities, genders, socio and educational backgrounds, the Muslims like other religionists, also held different religious views. The rich diversity gave new meaning to the statement of the Prophet Mohamed, Prophet of Islam, who said, “Diversity in my community is a blessing.” 

One of the most important unifying facts on which to build and grow the new Muslim community was that Islamic and American values overlapped seamlessly. These values include respect for law, justice, autonomy, family ties, equality, brotherhood/sisterhood, democracy to protect the minority, the sacred respect for nature, the importance of doing good deeds, and love of neighbor.

Beginning with the immigrant generation of Lebanese founders at the turn of the 20th century, this history will show that the founding families were doggedly determined throughout those long decades to establish their religious identity in America. They wanted their mosque to be seen as equally sacred as the churches and synagogues, and with a place of equal prominence on the American religious landscape. They modeled their mosque on those religious institutions. They set up a democratic administration system, copied fundraising events, imitated the way the churches were used for social purposes, and learned how to write the legal documents of by-laws and constitutions, necessary to legitimize a house of worship in America.

This history covers the contributions of the first generation of American-born founders and features the influence of the new immigrant pioneers who joined and built up the community from 1965 onward.  Since the first mosque in New England was built by its residents in one of the oldest and most celebrated cities in the country, the City of Presidents, its historical significance could not be more American. 
 

The mosque generally relied on elders and recent immigrants for religious guidance. In 1982, Talal Eid became the first imam of the mosque. In 1993, the ICNE opened a sister location in Sharon, Massachusetts, called the Sharon Mosque.

The primary function of ICNE is to oversee the operation of the two mosques it owns, located in Quincy and Sharon, Massachusetts. ICNE has about 3,000 members, many from various nations, and including Sunnis and Shias.

Leadership controversies 
A former board director (1982-2005) and imam, Talal Eid, says that in 2005 the ICNE board forced him from his leadership position because of his moderate Islamic teachings. Some news reports accuse several board members who forced him out of having connections to Islamic extremists, including then board president Dr. Abdul-badi Abousamra, a prominent endocrinologist at Massachusetts General Hospital who was also vice president of the Muslim American Society of Boston, which ran the Islamic Society of Boston, a Cambridge mosque. Dr. Abousamra's son, Ahmad Abousamra, is on the FBI Most Wanted Terrorists list.[2] The ICNE responded that it was an employment disagreement and that their "teachings fully respect the rule of American law and the sanctity of human life, and we have always unequivocally condemned all acts of terrorism."

Eid's replacement was Imam Hafiz Masood, an assistant imam who "had been forced on him in 1998 by Abousamra and who was known for fiery sermons easily interpreted as promoting violence." The non-profit organization Americans for Peace and Tolerance claims many of Masood's supporters remain in leadership roles in the Boston Muslim community, and some news reports claim that these radical doctrines at ICNE (and another mosque run by the Islamic Society of Boston) had a motivating influence on several well known local jihadists, including several below. However, Eid later clarified that although "he believed the city’s mosques should operate more democratically... he said the ideological tensions had no relationship to violence. 'Muslims all over are very good people, working hard, living their lives,' he said. 'In Boston, when you talk about terrorists, you can count them on the fingers of one hand. It’s not even one in 10,000.'"

Imam Hafiz Masood later left ICNE after volunteering for deportation in 2008 after being arrested on criminal visa fraud charges by the United States U.S. Immigration and Customs Enforcement. After returning to his hometown of Lahore, Pakistan, he became spokesman for the Pakistani terrorist organization Jamaat-ud-Dawah, a group founded by his brother, Hafiz Muhammad Saeed.

Recent Events
In 2015, with new leadership, the ICNE in Sharon began offering a youth curriculum designed to counter foreign social-media-based enticements to violent extremism, written by a father, optometrist and member of the local Massachusetts Muslim community named Nabeel Khudairi.  He explained, "'We want to protect young people from making bad decisions.'"  The program "examines video games and substance abuse, social media, and the sea of misinformation on the Web."  The year before, the Center's high schoolers participated in a winter camp called “Moderation.”

Leadership

Mosque leaders 
The current imams of the two mosques:
Quincy Mosque: Imam Khalid Nasr
Sharon Mosque: Imam Abdul Rahman Ahmad

See also
Islam in the United States

References

External links

Muslim Communities in North America, chapter 13, "The Islamic Center of New England"

Islamic organizations based in the United States
Islam in Massachusetts